The McCrone Agreement (A Teaching Profession for the 21st Century: Agreement reached following recommendations made in the McCrone Report) is an agreement about Scottish teachers' pay and conditions. The agreement, under the Labour-Liberal Democrat coalition government in 2001, followed an independent committee of inquiry which reviewed teachers' pay and conditions, chaired by Professor Gavin McCrone.

One of the key aims of the agreement was to ensure that teachers' working weeks would be limited to 35 hours though there is evidence that this has not been achieved.

See also 
 Education in Scotland

References

External links 
 A Teaching Profession for the 21st Century: Agreement reached following recommendations made in the McCrone Report
 THE MCCRONE AGREEMENT - 2007 Briefing document for the Scottish Parliament

2001 in Scotland
2001 in education
2001 in politics
Education in Scotland
Industrial agreements
Reports of the Scottish Government
Labour relations in Scotland
Working time
2001 in labor relations